Club de Futbol Balaguer is a Spanish football team based in Balaguer, in the autonomous community of Catalonia. Founded in 1945 it currently plays in Tercera División – Group 5, holding home games at Municipal de Balaguer, with a capacity of 2,000 seats. Balaguer was the last club local-born Roberto Martínez played for in Spain before moving to England. Roberto's father managed CF Balaguer in the eighties.

History 
Football first appeared in the city of Balaguer in 1916, when the students started to play each Thursday in the field near the current Municipal Theater.

Season to season

31 seasons in Tercera División

Current squad 
As of 22 December 2018

Notable players
 Koldo Álvarez
 Nuno Carvalho
 Roberto Martínez
 Ibán Parra
 Juan José Blanco
 Chad Bond
 Kerry Morgan
 Aristide Bancé

References

External links
Official website 
Futbolme team profile 

Football clubs in Catalonia
Association football clubs established in 1945
1945 establishments in Spain